The Minister of National Unity is Aaron Ago Dagang, since 3 December 2022. The minister administers the portfolio through the Ministry of National Unity .

List of ministers of national unity
The following individuals have been appointed as Minister of National Unity, or any of its precedent titles:

Political Party:

List of Ministers in the Prime Minister's Department (National Unity and Integration)

Political Party:

References

National Unity